Piragua may refer to:

 Piragua (food), a Puerto Rican frozen treat shaped like a pyramid
 "Piragua" (song), a piragua vendor's song (or its reprise) from the 2008 Broadway musical In the Heights
 "La Piragua" (song), a cumbia song by José Barros
 Piragua, or pirogue, a small, fast, flat-bottomed boat